Clitocybe cistophila is a species of agaric fungus in the family Tricholomataceae. Found in Europe, it was described as new to science in 1985 by mycologists Marcel Bon and Marco Contu. The type locality was in Sardinia, where the fungus was found fruiting in sandy soil under the rockrose species Cistus monspeliensis and Cistus salvifolius, suggesting the specific epithet cistophila, "Cistus-loving".

References

External links

cistophila
Fungi described in 1985
Fungi of Europe